Janne Laukkanen (born March 19, 1970) is a Finnish former professional ice hockey player.  He played in the National Hockey League for the Quebec Nordiques/Colorado Avalanche franchise, the Ottawa Senators, Pittsburgh Penguins, and the Tampa Bay Lightning.  He played a total 407 regular season games scoring 22 goals and 121 points with 335 penalty minutes.  He also played 59 playoff games, scoring 7 goals and 16 points.

He was a member of the Bronze winning Finnish ice hockey team at the 1994 and 1998 Winter Olympics.

He now works with Karhu-Kissat, a minor hockey league team in his native Finland, which includes his son Matias.

Career statistics

Regular season and playoffs

International

References

External links
 

1970 births
Colorado Avalanche players
Cornwall Aces players
Finnish ice hockey defencemen
Hartford Wolf Pack players
HPK players
Ice hockey players at the 1992 Winter Olympics
Ice hockey players at the 1994 Winter Olympics
Ice hockey players at the 1998 Winter Olympics
Living people
Olympic bronze medalists for Finland
Olympic ice hockey players of Finland
Ottawa Senators players
Sportspeople from Lahti
Pittsburgh Penguins players
Quebec Nordiques draft picks
Quebec Nordiques players
Tampa Bay Lightning players
Olympic medalists in ice hockey
Medalists at the 1998 Winter Olympics
Medalists at the 1994 Winter Olympics